Michael Jon Maker (born November 9, 1965) is the former head coach of Marist College men's basketball.

Biography

Coaching career
After a playing career at California Baptist University, Maker joined the staff of his alma mater as an assistant and junior varsity head coach, a position he held for two seasons. In 1990, he spent one season as the head women's basketball coach at Hartnell College before moving on to Dartmouth, where he served as an assistant from 1991 to 2002. Maker also had stops at Samford, West Virginia, and Creighton as an assistant before landing the men's head coaching job at Division III Williams College.

In his six seasons at Williams, Maker guided the Ephs to a 147–32 record (.821 winning percentage), and three Final Four appearances, including the title game in 2010 and 2014.

On June 17, 2014, Maker was named the 11th head coach in Marist basketball history, replacing Jeff Bower, who left to become the general manager of the NBA's Detroit Pistons. After a 28-97 record over four seasons, Maker was fired from Marist in 2018. Maker was named an assistant coach at St. Thomas on April 1, 2021 as the school transitions to Division I status for the 2021–22 season.

Head coaching record

NCAA DIII

NCAA DI

References

1965 births
Living people
American men's basketball coaches
Basketball coaches from California
Basketball players from California
California Baptist Lancers men's basketball players
California Baptist Lancers men's basketball coaches
College men's basketball head coaches in the United States
Creighton Bluejays men's basketball coaches
Dartmouth Big Green men's basketball coaches
Hartnell Panthers men's basketball players
Marist Red Foxes men's basketball coaches
Samford Bulldogs men's basketball coaches
St. Thomas (Minnesota) Tommies men's basketball coaches
Sportspeople from Salinas, California
West Virginia Mountaineers men's basketball coaches
Williams Ephs men's basketball coaches
American men's basketball players